Henry William Lee (1856 – 12 August 1927) was an Australian politician. Born in Gerringong, New South Wales, he was a dairy farmer on the Hunter Region, and became a leader in the dairying industry. In 1903, he was elected to the Australian House of Representatives for the Free Trade Party, emphatically defeating Protectionist Francis Clarke for the seat of Cowper. However, he in turn was defeated in 1906 by Protectionist John Thomson. Lee subsequently became a businessman in Sydney. He died in 1927.

References

Free Trade Party members of the Parliament of Australia
Members of the Australian House of Representatives for Cowper
Members of the Australian House of Representatives
1856 births
1927 deaths
20th-century Australian politicians